is a Japanese voice actress from Saitama Prefecture who is affiliated with Stardust Promotion. She is known for her roles as Hiromi Seki in The Idolmaster Cinderella Girls, Chiharu Andō in Chio's School Road, Shizuri Castiella Kasugaya in Strike the Blood, and Yuzuki Tachibana in Taisho Otome Fairy Tale.

Filmography

Television animation
2017
 Seiren as Rin Sanjō
 The Idolmaster Cinderella Girls Theater as Hiromi Seki

2018
 Chio's School Road as Chiharu Andō

2019
 Chidori RSC as Kozakura Konno

2020
 Kaguya-sama: Love Is War? as Female Student
 A Certain Scientific Railgun T as Female Student
 Monster Girl Doctor as Harpy A
 Higurashi: When They Cry – Gou as Waitress

2021
 Horimiya as High School Girl
 Mushoku Tensei: Jobless Reincarnation as Norn Greyrat
 The Slime Diaries: That Time I Got Reincarnated as a Slime as Kokobu
 Taisho Otome Fairy Tale as Yuzuki Tachibana
 Mieruko-chan as Monster
 Selection Project as Suzune Sakurai

2022
 In the Heart of Kunoichi Tsubaki as Kagetsu
 Engage Kiss as Kisara
 The Eminence in Shadow as Sherry Barnett

2023
 My Life as Inukai-san's Dog as Karen Inukai
 Too Cute Crisis as Kasumi Yanagi

Anime films
 Orange: Future (2016) as Haru

Original video animation
 Strike the Blood (2020–2022) as Shizuri Castiella Kasugaya

Video games
2017
 Trickster: Shōkan Samurai ni Naritai as Rosalyn
 Gyakuten Othellonia as Rinalia
 The Idolmaster Cinderella Girls as Hiromi Seki

2018
 Ange Vierge: Girls Battle as Sealum 999
 Sōten no Skygalleon as Sicily
 Kōsei Shōjo: Do The Scientists Dream of Girls' Asterism? as D. Argedi

2019
 For Whom the Alchemist Exists as Suey
 Megido 72 as Beval
 Z/X Code OverBoost as  Pectilis

2020
 Kōya no Kotobuki Hikōtai: Ōzora no Take Off Girls! as Madoka, Chiyo
 Brown Dust as Diana
 Kingdom of Hero as Astaroth
 Monster Strike as Marta

2021
 Uma Musume Pretty Derby as Mejiro Ardan

2022
 Heaven Burns Red as Charlotta Skopovskaya
 Azur Lane as Pompeo Magno
 Action Taimanin as Kannazuki Sora

References

External links
Agency profile 

1999 births
Living people
Stardust Promotion artists
Voice actresses from Saitama Prefecture.